is a district located in Fukushima Prefecture, Japan.

As of 2003, the district has an estimated population of 41,540 and a density of 87.18 persons per km2. The total area is 476.49 km2.

Towns and villages
Shinchi
Iitate

Merger
 On January 1, 2006 the city of Haramachi and the towns of Kashima and Odaka merged to create the city of Minamisōma.

See also
Radiation effects from Fukushima I nuclear accidents

Districts in Fukushima Prefecture